Anicla lubricans (slippery dart) is a moth of the family Noctuidae. It is found in the south-eastern part of the United States, ranging from North Carolina, south to Florida and west to eastern Texas.

The wingspan is about 35 mm. Adults are on wing year-round.

External links
Images
The Noctuinae (Lepidoptera: Noctuidae) of Great Smoky Mountains National Park, U.S.A.

Noctuinae
Moths described in 1852
Moths of North America